Bursera filicifolia is an uncommon  North American species of trees in the Frankincense Family in the soapwood order. It has been found only in the States of Sonora and Baja California Sur in northwestern Mexico.

Bursera filicifolia is a shrub or small tree with gray bark unlike the red bark of the closely related B. laxiflora. Leaves are pinnately compound with 9-19 leaflets, hairy on both sides. Drupes are hairless and egg-shaped.

References

filicifolia
Endemic flora of Mexico
Flora of Baja California Sur
Flora of Sonora
Plants described in 1908
Taxa named by Townshend Stith Brandegee